Luna 7 (E-6 or Ye-6 series) was an unmanned space mission of the Soviet Luna program, also called Lunik 7. The Luna 7 spacecraft was intended to achieve a soft landing on the Moon. However, due to premature retrofire and cutoff of the retrorockets, the spacecraft impacted the lunar surface in Oceanus Procellarum.

Unlike its predecessors, Luna 7 successfully carried out its mid-course correction on October 5 on the way to the Moon, in anticipation of a soft-landing two days later. However, immediately prior to planned retro-fire during the approach to the lunar surface, the spacecraft suddenly lost attitude control and failed to regain it. Automatic programmed systems then prevented the main engine from firing. As controllers observed helplessly, Luna 7 plummeted to the lunar surface at a very high speed, crashing at 22:08:24 UT on October 7, 1965, west of the Kepler crater, relatively near the actual intended target.

Later investigation indicated that the optical sensor of the astronavigation system had been set at the wrong angle and had lost sight of Earth during the critical attitude-control maneuver. It was the tenth consecutive failure in the Ye-6 program.

See also
 List of artificial objects on the Moon

References

External links

 Zarya - Luna programme chronology

Luna 07
Spacecraft launched in 1965
1965 in the Soviet Union
Spacecraft that impacted the Moon
1965 on the Moon